The 2015–16 USC Upstate Spartans men's basketball team represented the University of South Carolina Upstate during the 2015–16 NCAA Division I men's basketball season. The Spartans, led by 14th year head coach Eddie Payne, played their home games at the G. B. Hodge Center and were members of the Atlantic Sun Conference. They finished the season 10–22, 4–10 in A-Sun play to finish in a tie for 7th place. They lost in the quarterfinals of the A-Sun tournament to North Florida.

Roster

Schedule

|-
!colspan=9 style="background:#085435; color:#ffffff;"| Non-conference regular season

|-
!colspan=9 style="background:#085435; color:#FFFFFF;"| Atlantic Sun Conference regular season

|-
!colspan=9 style="background:#085435; color:#FFFFFF;"| Atlantic Sun tournament

References

USC Upstate Spartans men's basketball seasons
USC Upstate
Charleston Southern Buc South Carolina
Charleston Southern Buc South Carolina